Morten Nørgaard (Born 4 October 1990), is a Danish singer who won the tenth season of the Danish version of the X Factor.

Performances during X Factor

Discography

Singles
 "The Underdog" (2017)

EPs
 Cool Enough (2017)

References

External links

Living people
1990 births
21st-century Danish male  singers